was the eighth single by the Japanese band The Blue Hearts. The song was recut from the group's third album Train-Train. This song was written in opposition to the continuing apartheid of the time. "Heisei no Blues" (平成のブルース), the B-side track, was not on the album Train-Train.

The song was covered by miwa in 2010, for use as the ending theme song of the animated film adaptation of Eto Mori's novel Colorful. Mone Kamishiraishi worked with Glim Spanky on a cover of the song for her 2021 album Ano Uta -2-.

In December 2019, the song was published as a picture book with illustrations by French artist Botchy-Botchy. Publisher is Gendaishokan and is only available in Japanese for the time being. The book also features a 2 pages original text written by Yoshimoto Banana, who is a fan of the band ´The Blue Hearts’.

References

The Blue Hearts songs
1989 singles
Songs written by Masatoshi Mashima
1988 songs